Stig M. Bergström (born 12 June 1935 in Skövde) is a Swedish-American paleontologist.

In 1981, he described the conodont family Paracordylodontidae. In 1974, he described the multielement conodont genus Appalachignathus from the Middle Ordovician of North America.

Awards and tributes 
He received the Pander Medal by the Pander Society. In 1999, he received the Raymond C. Moore Medal, awarded by the Society for Sedimentary Geology to persons who have made significant contributions in the field which have promoted the science of stratigraphy by research in paleontology and evolution and the use of fossils for interpretations of paleoecology. In 2011, he received the Paleontological Society Medal.

The rhipidognathid conodont genus Bergstroemognathus Spergali 1974 has been named in his honour.

References

 Stig Bergström and Walter C. Sweet, The generic concept in conodont taxonomy. Proceedings North American Paleontological Convention, 1, 1969, S. 29–42.
 Stig Bergström and Walter C. Sweet, Conodont provinces and biofacies of the Late Ordovician, Geological Society of America Special Papers 196, 1984, S. 69–88
 Stig Bergström and Walter C. Sweet, Conodonts and Biostratigraphic Correlation, Annual Review of Earth and Planetary Sciences, 14, 1986, S. 85–112

External links
 Stig Bergström at the Ohio State University website (retrieved 17 June 2016)

Conodont specialists
American paleontologists
Swedish paleontologists
1935 births
Living people